The 2003 Cleveland Browns season was the franchise's 55th season as a professional sports franchise and its 51st season as a member of the National Football League. The Browns were unable to replicate the success from the previous season, and they ended up winning only five games. They failed to return to the playoffs. This season would begin a stretch, which was unbroken until the 2020 season, in which the Browns would not make it to the playoffs in any capacity.

Offseason

2003 NFL Draft

Undrafted free agents

Personnel

Roster

Regular season

Schedule
Apart from their AFC North division games, the Browns played against the AFC West and NFC West according to the NFL’s conference rotation, and played the Colts and Patriots based on 2002 standings in their respective AFC divisions.

Standings

Game summaries

Week 2: at Baltimore 

Browns linebacker Andra Davis telephoned Ravens running back Jamal Lewis before the game and stated he wanted Lewis to carry the ball at least thirty times in their upcoming matchup.  “If that happens, it's going to be a career day’, Lewis replied.  Lewis then erupted to 295 rushing yards, breaking the record previously held by Corey Dillon in 2000 as the Browns fell 33–13.

Week 11: vs. Arizona

References

External links 
 2003 Cleveland Browns at Pro Football Reference (Profootballreference.com)
 2003 Cleveland Browns Statistics at jt-sw.com
 2003 Cleveland Browns Schedule at jt-sw.com
 2003 Cleveland Browns at DatabaseFootball.com  

Cleveland
Cleveland Browns seasons
Cleveland